Ali Al-Abed (born 1970) is an Emirati former cyclist. He competed at the 1988 Summer Olympics and the 1992 Summer Olympics.

References

External links
 

1970 births
Living people
Emirati male cyclists
Olympic cyclists of the United Arab Emirates
Cyclists at the 1988 Summer Olympics
Cyclists at the 1992 Summer Olympics
Place of birth missing (living people)